Engelbert Humperdinck may refer to:

 Engelbert Humperdinck (composer) (1854–1921), German composer
 Engelbert Humperdinck (singer) (born 1936), British pop singer
 Engelbert Humperdinck (album)

See also
 Humperdinck, a name

Humperdinck, Engelbert